Acronicta longa, the long-winged dagger moth, is a moth of the family Noctuidae. The species was first described by Achille Guenée in 1852. It is found across much of North America, with Nova Scotia, Alberta, Florida, and Texas within is range.

The wingspan is 32–44 mm.

The larvae feed on birch, blackberry, oak and willow.

External links

"Acronicta longa". Moths of Maryland. Retrieved November 12, 2020.
"Acronicta longa Guenée, 1852 - Long-winged Dagger". Moths of North Carolina. Retrieved November 12, 2020.

Acronicta
Moths of North America
Moths described in 1852